Changyang station is a station on Fangshan Line of the Beijing Subway.

Station Layout 
The station has an elevated island platform.

Exits 
The station has 2 exits, lettered A and B. Exit A is accessible.

References

Beijing Subway stations in Fangshan District